Mili is a Loloish language spoken in Jingdong County (in Anding 安定乡 and Wenlong 文龙乡 townships), Yun, Zhenyuan, and Xinping counties of Yunnan province, China. Mili is a variety of Lolopo.

Vocabulary
The following basic vocabulary word list of Mili is from the Xinping County Ethnic Gazetteer  (1992:79-80).

References

Xinping County Ethnic Gazetteer [新平彝族傣族自治县民族志] (1992). Kunming: Yunnan People's Press [云南民族出版社].

Loloish languages
Languages of China